Chad Biafore (born 28 March 1968) is an Italian ice hockey player. He competed in the men's tournament at the 1998 Winter Olympics.

References

1968 births
Living people
Olympic ice hockey players of Italy
Ice hockey players at the 1998 Winter Olympics
Ice hockey people from Calgary
Vernon Lakers players
Portland Winterhawks players
Springfield Indians players
Louisville Icehawks players
Calgary Rad'z players
New Jersey Rockin' Rollers players
HC Varese players
Asiago Hockey 1935 players